Züri West (Swiss German for Zürich West) is a Swiss rock band. Most of their songs are written in Bernese German.

The band's name is an ironic reference to Bern, the capital of Switzerland, as merely a place west of Zürich, the largest city in Switzerland.

Line-up

Current members
 Kuno Lauener (vocals): since 1984
 Markus Fehlmann (guitar): since 1984
Gert Stäuble (drums): since 1993
Manuel Häfliger (guitar): since 2017
Wolfgang Zwieauer (bass): since 2017

Former members
 Peter Schmid (bass): 1984-1986
 Sam Mumenthaler (drums): 1984-1986
Martin S. Silfverberg (drums): 1986–1992
 Peter von Siebenthal (guitar): 1984-2000
 Martin Gerber (bass): 1986–2000
Oli Kuster (keyboards): 2000-2004
Jürg Schmidhauser (bass): 2000-2012
Tom Etter (guitar): 2000-2017

Discography
 Splendid EP (December 13, 1985) - Black Cat at Bebop
 Kirchberg EP  (November, 1986) - Black Cat at Sound Service
 Sport und Musik (November 15, 1987) - Black Cat at Sound Service
 Bümpliz - Casablanca (May 13, 1989) - Black Cat at Sound Service
 Elvis (June 15, 1990) - Black Cat at Sound Service
 Arturo Bandini (November 15, 1991) - Sound Service
 Wintertour (November 21, 1992) - Weltrekords at Sound Service
 Züri West (May 10, 1994) - Weltrekords at Sound Service
 Hoover Jam  (May 11, 1996) - Weltrekords at Sound Service
 Super 8 (March 6, 1999) - Weltrekords at Sound Service
 Radio zum Glück (August 25, 2001) - Weltrekords at Sound Service
 Retour - Best of (November 15, 2003) - Weltrekords at Sound Service
 Aloha from Züri West (June 12, 2004) - Weltrekords at Sound Service
 Haubi Songs (January 12, 2008) - Weltrekords at Sound Service
 HomeRekords (April 23, 2010) - Weltrekords at Sound Service
 Göteborg (March 23, 2012) - Sound Service
 Love (March 24, 2017) - Sound Service

Videography
 Am Blues vorus (March 28, 2003)

External links

 The band's website

Musical groups established in 1985
Swiss rock music groups
1985 establishments in Switzerland